Okemos High School is a public high school in Okemos, Michigan, United States.  It is the only high school in the Okemos Public Schools district.  It is located southeast of the main campus of Michigan State University, between Bennett and Jolly Roads on the North and South, and Hulett and Hagadorn Roads on the East and West. The current building was completed in 1994, replacing the now Chippewa Middle School building as the district's high school. Former students of Chippewa 7-8 School comprise the school's student body.

Attendance area
The school district (and therefore the high school's attendance boundary) includes approximately two-thirds of Meridian Township, Michigan and portions of Alaiedon and Williamstown townships. It includes most of Okemos, as well as portions of Lansing, Haslett, and East Lansing.

Academics

An extensive Advanced Placement (AP) curriculum is in place, in which 59% of students participate. To ensure high quality, admission to AP courses requires high achievement in prerequisite classes and a committee approval.

Okemos High School was ranked 13th in the state of Michigan in U.S. News & World Report's 2021 list of "America's Best High Schools". The student to teacher ratio at Okemos High School is 19 students to 1 teacher.

Okemos High School is recognized by NCA (North Central Association of Colleges and Schools) as an accredited public high school.

Extracurriculars 
The Okemos High School quiz bowl varsity team is consistently a top performer nationally; in 2016, 2017, and 2018, they qualified for NAQT nationals held in Dallas, TX (2016), in Atlanta, GA (2017 and 2018), and virtually (2021). Okemos High School finished 53rd nationally in Quiz Bowl in 2016 and 25th in 2017.

Okemos High School offers band, choir and orchestra in the performing arts section. The top orchestra is Philharmonic, the top band is SWE (Symphonic Wind Ensemble), and the top choir is Someko (which is Okemos spelled backwards). Okemos has many performers qualify for the All-State orchestra.

The Okemos High School theatre program is another popular extracurricular activity in the performing arts section. The school typically puts on three shows each year including a spring musical.

Notable alumni 
Jason P. Miller (2002), professor of mathematics at the University of Cambridge
Rob Bell (1988), founding pastor of Mars Hill Bible Church and author of Velvet Elvis
Curtis John Cregan (born January 18, 1977), an American actor who appeared in the American version of the children's television show Hi-5
Paul Quantrill (1986), major league baseball pitcher
John Bennett Ramsey, father of JonBenét Ramsey
Kristen Rasmussen (1996), professional basketball player, WNBA
Peter Reckell (1973), actor, played Bo Brady on the TV soap opera Days of Our Lives
Tom Welling (1995), actor, played Clark Kent on the TV series Smallville
Richa Gangopadhyay, (2004) model, popular lead actress in Indian Cinema, particularly in South India
Tyler Oakley (2007), YouTube personality and advocate for LGBT youth
Kim Chi (drag queen) (2006), South Korean-American drag queen, artist, and television personality best known as a contestant on season 8 of RuPaul's Drag Race
Taylor Moton (2012), NFL player for the Carolina Panthers
Donald Keck (1941), American physicist
Walter Willett (1945), American, Harvard University School of Public Health
Tessa Kaneene (2003), Harvard Advisor and White House Council member

Athletics
The mascot has been a topic of debate since the mid-1990s. The school agreed in 2004 to phase out Chieftains in favor of Chiefs. In 2021, the school board voted unanimously to drop the Chiefs mascot entirely. "Wolves" was voted on and selected as the new mascot name, then approved by the school board. The main issue is funding the change, leading to an anticipated 2023 date for completing it.

Okemos fields teams for both boys and girls in many sports. The Chiefs are a member of the Capital Area Activities Conference. State Championship winners are listed below. The following sports are offered:

Baseball (boys)
Basketball (girls & boys)
Girls State champions - 1981
Boys state champions - 1981, 1982
Cheerleading (girls-sideline)
Cross Country (girls & boys)
Boys state champions - 1986
Football (boys)
Golf (girls & boys)
Boys state champions - 1976
Hockey (boys)
Lacrosse (girls & boys)
Girls state champions - 2009, 2010
Skiing (girls & boys)
Boys state champions - 1977
Soccer (girls & boys)
Girls state champions - 2006, 2012
Boys state champions - 1984, 2004, 2021
Softball (girls)
State champions - 1999
Swimming (girls & boys)
Girls state champions - 1980
Tennis (girls & boys)
Girls state champions - 1983, 1993, 1994, 1995, 1998, 1999, 2000, 2001
Boys state champions - 1986, 1989, 1992, 1994, 1995, 1997, 1999, 2000, 2004, 2005, 2006, 2007, 2017, 2020 (D1)
Track (girls & boys)
Boys state champions - 1928, 1930, 1937
Volleyball (girls)
Water Polo (not MHSAA sanctioned) (girls & boys)
Girls state champions - 2010, 2011, 2014
Boys state champions - 2018
Wrestling (boys)
State champions - 1965, 1966, 1967

References

External links
Okemos High School
Okemos Public Schools

Public high schools in Michigan
School buildings completed in 1994
Schools in Ingham County, Michigan
1994 establishments in Michigan